Darevskia dahli is a species of lizard in the family Lacertidae. The species is native to Eastern Europe and Western Asia.

Etymology
The specific name, dahli, is in honor of Russian zoologist Sergei Konstantinovich Dahl.

Geographic range
D. dahli is found in Armenia, Georgia, and Ukraine.

Habitat

Reproduction
D. dahli is oviparous and parthenogenetic. An adult female may lay a clutch of 2–5 eggs.

References

Further reading
Darevsky IS (1957). "[Systematics and ecology of rock lizards, Lacerta saxicola Eversmann, in Armenia]". Zoologicheskii Sbornik, Akademiya Nauk Armyanskoi SSR 10: 27–57. (Lacerta saxicola dahli, new subspecies, p. 32). (in Russian with an abstract in Armenian).
Darevsky IS (1966). "Natural Parthenogenesis in a Polymorphic Group of Caucasian Rock Lizards Related to Lacerta saxicola Eversmann". Journal of the Ohio Herpetological Society 5 (4): 115–152. (Lacerta dahli, new taxonomic status, p. 127).

Darevskia
Fauna of Georgia (country)
Reptiles described in 1957
Taxa named by Ilya Darevsky